Lucian Florin Dronca (born 30 May 1973, in Arad) is a retired Romanian professional footballer who last played for Maltese Premier League side Sliema Wanderers.

During 1999–2001 he played for a short while in Hungary and two years in Germany in lower divisions.

Dronca played for Singaporean side Woodlands Wellington FC.

References

External links
 Lucian Dronca at MaltaFootball.com
 

1973 births
Living people
Sportspeople from Arad, Romania
Romanian footballers
Association football midfielders
Association football defenders
Croatian Football League players
FC UTA Arad players
NK Osijek players
NK Istra players
HNK Segesta players
Birkirkara F.C. players
Sliema Wanderers F.C. players
Romanian expatriate footballers
Expatriate footballers in Croatia
Expatriate footballers in Malta
Expatriate footballers in Singapore
Romanian expatriate sportspeople in Croatia
Romanian expatriate sportspeople in Singapore
Romanian expatriate sportspeople in Malta
Woodlands Wellington FC players
Singapore Premier League players